Juárez is one of the 67 municipalities of Chihuahua, in northern Mexico. The municipal seat lies at Ciudad Juárez.

In the 2010 INEGI Census, the municipality reported a total population of 1,332,131, of whom 1,321,004 (over 99%) lived in the municipal seat.

The municipality is named for 19th-century president Benito Juárez, as is the city of Ciudad Juárez.

Geography

Towns and villages
The municipality has 147 localities. The largest are:

Adjacent municipalities and counties
 Guadalupe Municipality - southeast
 Ahumada Municipality - south
 Ascensión Municipality - west
 Doña Ana County, New Mexico - northwest
 El Paso County, Texas - north and northeast

References

Municipalities of Chihuahua (state)
Ciudad Juárez
Chihuahua (state) populated places on the Rio Grande